Slovenia women's national floorball team is the national team of Slovenia. The team participated in the Qualification to the B-Division for the 2007 Floorball Women's World Championship.  The qualifiers were held in Wolsztyn, Poland and Kapfenberg, Austria. The team did not advance out of qualifiers. The team participated in the Qualification to the B-Division for the 2009 Floorball Women's World Championship.  The qualifiers were held in Idrija, Slovenia. The team did not advance out of qualifiers.

References 

Women's national floorball teams
Floorball